Fleur Carnivore is a live album by American composer, bandleader and keyboardist Carla Bley recorded at the Jazzhus Montmartre in 1988 and released on the Watt/ECM label in 1989.

Reception
The album is recognised as one of Bley's finest. The Allmusic review by Stephen Cook awarded the album 4½ stars and stated, "On Fleur Carnivore, pianist Carla Bley deftly integrates her beautiful melodies into five complex, yet effortless sounding pieces... Fleur Carnivore is one of Bley's best titles and good place to start for newcomers".  The Penguin Guide to Jazz awarded it 3½ stars stating, "This is something like a masterpiece".

Track listing
All compositions by Carla Bley.
 "Fleur Carnivore" - 11:12  
 "Song of the Eternal Waiting of Canute" - 9:48  
 "Ups and Downs" - 7:05  
 "The Girl Who Cried Champagne Parts 1-3" - 17:15  
 "Healing Power" - 10:27  
Recorded at the Montmartre, Copenhagen, Denmark on November 14–16, 1988.

Personnel
Carla Bley - piano
Lew Soloff, Jens Winther - trumpet
Frank Lacy - french horn, flugelhorn  
Gary Valente - trombone  
Bob Stewart - tuba  
Daniel Beaussier - oboe, flute  
Wolfgang Puschnig - alto saxophone, flute  
Andy Sheppard - tenor saxophone, clarinet  
Christof Lauer tenor saxophone, soprano saxophone  
Roberto Ottini - baritone saxophone, soprano saxophone  
Karen Mantler - harmonica, organ, vibes, chimes  
Steve Swallow - bass guitar  
Buddy Williams - drums
Don Alias - percussion

References

ECM Records live albums
Carla Bley live albums
1989 live albums